George Sylvester Schiller (July 3, 1900 – December 24, 1946) was an American sprinter who competed at the 1920 Summer Olympics. He finished fourth with the American 4 × 400 m relay team and failed to reach the final of the individual 400 m event.

References

1900 births
1946 deaths
Track and field athletes from Los Angeles
American male sprinters
Athletes (track and field) at the 1920 Summer Olympics
Olympic track and field athletes of the United States
20th-century American people